Raden Angger Dimas Riyanto (born 1 March 1988) professionally known as Angger Dimas, is an Indonesian electronic musician, DJ and music producer from Jakarta, Indonesia. Angger Dimas student of 34 Senior High School, Jakarta & 68 Junior High School, Jakarta, started playing guitar at age 7 and first became active in the Jakarta club scene in 2009. He is the #1 DJ of Indonesia according to thedjlist.com.

Career
Angger Dimas signed with Australian record label Vicious Vinyl in early 2009. His debut release "Duck Army" was played by Tocadisco, Joachim Garraud, Laidback Luke and more. Dimas then collaborated with Vandalism and earned international support on their release "She Got It" which was included on the Ministry of Sound Australia Annual 2010 CD and played by Sebastian Ingrosso as his opening track at the "Sensation" New Year's Eve event in Melbourne. Their collaboration was regularly heard in the playlists of David Guetta, Chuckie, Armand Van Helden, Laidback Luke and Axwell.

Angger Dimas continued releasing remixes including Richard Vission & Static Revenger "I Like That", which reached #1 on the Cool Cuts Club Chart UK, Avicii, Afrojack, R3hab, Ian Carey, Kaskade, Tommie Sunshine, Amy Meredith, Sandro Silva (DJ) and Havana Brown (musician). Angger opened for DJ Tiësto in Bangkok 2010, after which the two collaborated to create the group called "Boys Will Be Boys". In 2011 they released the 3 track EP "We Rock." The title track reached the Top 10 of the Beatport Electro House chart, and was also featured on Tiësto's Clublife Mix Compilation Album. In 2011, he teamed up with Belgian trio Dimitri Vegas & Like Mike and Yves V, on their collaborative release "Madagascar", written for the Tomorrowland Festival. One of his earlier tracks "Hey Freak" was leaked when it featured in the DJ sets of Afrojack, Steve Aoki and Laidback Luke at the Electric Daisy Carnival festival.

Angger Dimas has now DJ'ed in Australia and New Zealand with multiple tours in February 2010 supporting Avicii, November 2010, February 2011 supporting Oliver Twizt & Laidback Luke and again in November 2011 with Hardwell & Calvertron. In September 2011 Angger toured USA playing together with Steve Aoki & Sidney Samson in Las Vegas and played the Nocturnal Festival alongside the Bassjackers, Dirty South (musician) and Avicii and then co-headlined an ADE party in Amsterdam with Hardwell. 2012 saw the release of collaborations with Steve Aoki, "Steve Jobs", Phat Brahms, Beat Down and a remix of Afrojack & R3hab's "Prutataaa", the first track of Angger's first album "Release Me" (featuring Polina) and a collaboration with Bassjackers, "RIA". Later in the year Angger played at Tomorrowland (Belgium) on the Dim Mak Up All Night Stage and also joining Steve Aoki, Dimitri Vegas & Like Mike on the mainstage to debut their new collaboration 'Phat Brahms' live on the Tomorrowland TV Stream.

Angger has been showing his existences by releasing singles and collaboration with the likes of Diplo, Travis Porter and Will Brennan. Angger also co-producer(remix) for Linkin Park and Steve Aoki's single and Yellow Claw. Angger Dimas also is number 134 on DJMAG 2015 and number 1 in Indonesia and Asia so far.

Current work
Angger Dimas debut album titled Angger Management came out on Steve Aoki's Dim Mak Records and Vicious Recordings on September 3, 2013. On the album, there are collaborations with Steve Aoki, Tara McDonald & Piyu on the track "More Than Just A Feeling", Vandalism and many more. Along with the album, Angger Dimas has announced a forthcoming tour throughout North America. The 'Angger Management' Tour starts at Electric Zoo Festival September 1, 2013 and ends after a performance at the debut of TomorrowWorld in the United States, where Angger will join Dim Mak artists and Steve Aoki on the Up All Night Stage.

Selected discography

Albums 
 2013 – Angger Management (Dim Mak Records)

Singles and EPs 
 2019 Thomas Gold & Angger Dimas - HI LO (Revealed Recordings)
 2019 Angger Dimas x Wendy Marc - Glad You Came (Be Rich Records)
 2018 Angger Dimas & Nervo - Give It All Up (Armada Music)
 2016 Angger Dimas - Angger Dimas & Friends EP (Be Rich Records)
 2016 NOAH - Sendiri Lagi (Angger Dimas Remix) (Musica Studios)
 2016 Drop That Low (feat. FERAL is KINKY) – Angger Dimas & South Control (Dim Mak Records) 
 2015 Zombie – Angger Dimas feat. Luciana (Mixmash Records)
 2013 Singularity – Steve Aoki, Angger Dimas feat. My Name is Kay
 2012 Phat Brahms – Steve Aoki & Angger Dimas Vs. Dimitri Vegas & Like Mike
 2012 Resurrection – Angger Dimas (Vicious Recordings)
 2012 Night Like This – Laidback Luke & Angger Dimas (feat. Polina)
 2012 Beat Down – Steve Aoki & Angger Dimas (feat. Iggy Azalea)
 2012 Coffee Shots – Angger Dimas & Piyulogi Feat. ANI & RamaRival
 2012 Release Me – Angger Dimas feat. Polina (Vicious Recordings)
 2012 Steve Jobs – Steve Aoki feat Angger Dimas (Dim Mak Records/Ultra)
 2012 Hey Freak! – Angger Dimas (Mixmash Records)
 2012 Kitchen – Angger Dimas (Mixmash Records)
 2012 Work My Love – Angger Dimas (Mixmash Records)
 2011 We Rock EP – Tiësto, Angger Dimas & Showtek present Boys Will Be Boys (Musical Freedom)
 2011 Madagascar (Mostiko) – Dimitri Vegas – Like Mike, Yves V & Angger Dimas 	
 2011 Big Fucking House – Angger Dimas vs. Tommy Trash (Vicious Recordings)	
 2010 Are You Ready (Vicious Recordings)	
 2010 Plastik	(Vicious Recordings)
 2010 Love Is What We've Got – Angger Dimas And Digital Lab (Vicious Recordings)
 2009: Vandalism & Angger Dimas – She Got It 12" (Rise)

Remixes
 2017 Do you like bass? (Angger Dimas Remix) – Yellow Claw & Juyen Sebulba [Barong Family]
 2014 Kaolo Pt. 2 (Angger Dimas Remix) – Yellow Claw [Mad Decent]
 2014 Keep on Dancing (Angger Dimas Remix) – The Bloody Beetroots Feat. Drop The Lime [Dim Mak]
 2014 So High (Angger Dimas Remix) – Doja Cat 
 2014 High (Angger Dimas Remix) – Peking Duk [Vicious Bitch]
 2014 Eternal (Angger Dimas Remix) – Eternal [Vicious]
 2014 A Light That Never Comes (Angger Dimas Remix) – Steve Aoki & Linkin Park [Dim Mak]
 2013 Surrender (Angger Dimas Remix) – Daddy's Groove feat. Mindshake [Ultra]
 2013 Star Wars (Angger Dimas Remix) – Jahreecellex (Jahreece Vangoregan Campbell)
 2012 Prutataaa (Angger Dimas Remix) – Afrojack & R3hab Wall
 2012 Tornado (Angger Dimas Remix) – Tiesto & Steve Aoki Dim Mak
 2012 Ladi Dadi (Angger Dimas Remix) – Steve Aoki Feat Wynter Gordon [Ultra]
 2012 Make It Drop (Angger Dimas Remix) – Starfuckers [House of Fun]
 2012 Queen of Hearts (Angger Dimas Remix) – Jay'elle'Dee [Mercury Records]
 2011 Get Lower (Angger Dimas Jungle Swag Remix) – Sandro Silva [Atlantic]
 2011 Rollercoaster Baby (Angger Dimas Remix) – Rob Roy [Dim Mak]
 2011 We Run The Night (Angger Dimas Remix) – Havana Brown [Universal]
 2011 Summer of Love (Angger Dimas Remix) – The Immigrant [Sony Australia]
 2011 Walking Away (Angger Dimas Remix) – Viro & Rob Analyse [Noiseporn]
 2011 Lift Up Dat (Angger Dimas Remix) – So Shifty [Moveltraxx]
 2011 Dope Demand (Angger Dimas Remix) – Dimitri Vegas & Like Mike [CNR Music]
 2011 Swallow (Angger Dimas Remix) – Crystal Fighters [Zirkulo Spain]
 2011 in Your Mind (Angger Dimas Remix) – Tiësto feat. Nina Diaz
 2011 Vegas (Angger Dimas Remix) – Vandalism & Static Revenger [Vicious]
 2011 Fire in Your New Shoes (Angger Dimas Remix) – Kaskade [Ultra USA]
 2011 Like This (Angger Dimas Remix) – Sgt Slick [Vicious]
 2011 Young at Heart (Angger Dimas Remix) – Amy Meredith [Sony Australia]
 2011 Hello (Angger Dimas Remix) – The Potbelleez [Vicious]
 2011 Need You Baby (Angger Dimas Remix) – IKIA [Bam Bam Records]
 2011 This Noiz (Angger Dimas Remix) – Neon Stereo [Hussle Recordings]
 2011 Work It Out (Angger Dimas Remix) – mrTimothy Feat Sharon Pass [Vicious]
 2010 I Am Your DJ (Angger Dimas Remix) – butterBOX [Vicious]
 2010 Trip'en (Angger Dimas Monster Remix) – StoneBridge [Armada]
 2010 Skin I'm In (Angger Dimas Remix) – Static Revenger [Vicious]
 2010 My Feelings For You (Angger Dimas Remix) – Avicii & Sebastien Drums [Vicious]
 2010 Your Horny Horns (Angger Dimas Remix) – Mac Zimms [Spinnin, Netherlands]
 2010 All You (Angger Dimas Remix) – Kaskade [Ultra USA]
 2010 Blackwater (Angger Dimas Remixes) – Carl Kennedy & Tommy Trash Feat. Rosie Henshaw [Subliminal]
 2010 Disco & Stilettos (Angger Dimas Remix) – Brew Ramson [Clubland Records]
 2010 Rockstar (Angger Dimas Remix) – Silver Service [Bam Bam Muzik]
 2010 Destroy Disco (Angger Dimas Remix) – Tom Piper & Bender [Bam Bam Muzik]
 2010 Gangstadam (Angger Dimas Remix) – Oliver Twizt [Mix Mash, Netherlands]
 2010 Back on Black (Angger Dimas Remix) – Sgt Slick & Chardy [Vicious]
 2010 5 am (Angger Dimas Remix) – Tommie Sunshine [Ultra USA]
 2010 Throw Your Hands Up (Angger Dimas Remix) – Vandalism [Vicious]
 2010 Paranoia (Angger Dimas Remix) – Sandro Silva [Spinnin, Netherlands]
 2010 I Like That (Angger Dimas Remix) – Richard Vission & Static Revenger starring Luciana [Frenetic UK / Solmatic US]
 2010 Even (Angger Dimas Remix) – Avicii & Sebastian Drums [Vicious]
 2010 Special (Angger Dimas Remix) – Sir James [Defected]
 2010 Got 2 Get Up (Angger Dimas Remix) – mrTimothy feat Inaya Day [Vicious]
 2010 Sweat (Angger Dimas Remix) – The Cut & Mind Electric [Vicious]
 2010 Shot Caller (Angger Dimas Remix) – Ian Carey [Vicious / 3Beat UK]
 2010 Heartbreak [Make Me A Dancer] (Angger Dimas Remix) – Freemasons feat Sophie Ellis-Bextor [Loaded UK]
 2010 Rock Da House (Angger Dimas Remix) – Mind Electric [Vicious]
 2010 Come On (Angger Dimas Remix) – Javi Mula [Vicious / Blanco Y Negro, Spain]
 2010 Right in the Night (Angger Dimas Remix) – Sgt Slick [Vicious]

References

External links 

 
 

Living people
People from Jakarta
Indonesian Muslims
1988 births
Indonesian musicians
Indonesian DJs
Electronic dance music DJs